Abbas Malekzadeh Milani (born 1949) is an Iranian-American historian, educator, and author. Milani is a visiting professor of Political Science, and the Hamid and Christina Moghadam Director of the Iranian Studies program at Stanford University. He is also a research fellow and co-director of the Iran Democracy Project at Stanford University's Hoover Institution. In Milani's book, Lost Wisdom: Rethinking Modernity in Iran (2004, Mage Publications), he has found evidence that Persian modernism dates back to more than 1,000 years ago.

Biography
Milani was born in Iran to a prosperous family and was sent to California when he was sixteen, graduating from Oakland Technical High School in 1966 after only one year of studies. Milani earned his B.A. in political science and economics from the University of California, Berkeley in 1970; and his Ph.D. in political science from the University of Hawaii in 1974.

With his then-girlfriend Fereshteh, Milani returned to Iran to serve as an assistant professor of political science at the National University of Iran from 1975 to 1977. He lectured on Marxist themes veiled in metaphor but was jailed for two years as a political prisoner for "activities against the government". He was a research fellow at the Iranian Center for Social Research from 1977 to 1978. He was also an assistant professor of law and political science at the University of Tehran and a member of the board of directors of Tehran University's Center for International Studies from 1979 to 1986, but after the Iranian Revolution he was not allowed to publish or teach. He left Iran in 1986 during the time of the Iran–Iraq War for the United States, and his son Hamid and his wife Fereshteh followed.

Returning to California, Milani was appointed professor of History and Political Science as well as chair of the department at Notre Dame de Namur University in Belmont, California. He served as a research fellow at the Institute of International Studies at University of California, Berkeley (UC Berkeley).

Milani became a Hoover Institution research fellow in 2001 and left Notre Dame de Namur for Stanford University in 2002. He is currently the Hamid and Christina Moghadam Director of Iranian Studies at Stanford University.

Political activities
Milani embraced Marxism–Leninism during his youth and was a member of a Maoist underground cell that was uncovered by Iranian security forces in 1975. He was subsequently jailed at Evin Prison, and became disillusioned with revolutionary politics. His eventual ideology has been described as neoconservative. In July 2009, Milani appeared in a United States House Committee on Foreign Affairs hearing amidst 2009 Iranian presidential election protests, and called for imposing "multilateral and crippling sanctions" on Iranians. He also advised the congressmen not to support military invasion of Iran because it would not politically contribute to the American goal of regime change. Shortly afterwards, Iranian prosecutors in the post-election trials built a case against the defendants by connecting them to Milani, mentioning him by name in the official indictment. Hamid Dabashi criticized Milani for throwing monkey wrenches at Green Movement of Iran by supporting foreign intervention instead of grassroots democracy in Iran.

Personal life 
Milani separated from his first wife, Fereshteh Davaran, in 1988. He lives on Stanford campus with his second wife, Jean Nyland, who is chair of Notre Dame de Namur's psychology department.

Bibliography

Books

Essays and articles

References

External links 

 Milani's Official Stanford Web Site
 Milani's Hoover Institution Biography

1949 births
Living people
Boston Review people
Iranian expatriate academics
Iranian dissidents
Iranian emigrants to the United States
20th-century Iranian historians
Iranian Iranologists
Iranian democracy activists
Stanford University School of Humanities and Sciences faculty
Notre Dame de Namur University faculty
University of California, Berkeley alumni
University of Hawaiʻi alumni
21st-century American historians